Pingtan is a town in Jiaoqu (Jiao District), Yangquan, Shanxi province, China. , it has eleven villages under its administration: 
Longfenggou Village
Ganhe Village
Taolingou Village
Weijiayu Village
Xinxing Village
Potou Village
Sangzhang Village
Zhongzhuang Village
Beinao Village
Xishangzhuang Village
Houyu Village

See also 
 List of township-level divisions of Shanxi

References 

Township-level divisions of Shanxi
Yangquan